FryDay is a 2018 Indian comedy-drama film directed by Abhishek Dogra. It is produced by Sajid Qureshi and PVR Pictures and stars Govinda, Varun Sharma, Prabhleen Sandhu and Digangana Suryavanshi in lead roles. The film was scheduled to release on 11 May 2018. It was released on 12 October 2018.

Plot 
Rajeev is a salesman who works for Pavitra Paani Purifiers. He was unable to sell any water purifiers for the few days. So his boss gives him the last chance. Rajeev goes to his friends' restaurant and he tells him that Gagan's wife needs a purifier. Gagan is a stage actor and his wife works for NGO. And she goes to shimla for few days. Gagan calls a girl and she arrives at his home.  And suddenly Gagan finds a thief in his house.  The thief blackmails him for Gagan was having an extramarital affair. And Rajeev calls Gagan's wife and she says that her husband will be present at her house and Rajeev goes to the house and misunderstands the girl as Gagan's wife and comical incidence takes place at the house.

Cast

 Govinda as Gagan Kapoor
 Prabhleen Sandhu as Bela Kapoor 
 Varun Sharma as Rajiv Chabbra 
 Sanjay Mishra as Manchanda
 Brijendra Kala as Thief 
 Rajesh Sharma as Inspector Ranpal, Bindu's husband 
 Digangana Suryavanshi as Bindu Ranpal (Gagan's love interest) / Fake Bindu Rajiv Chabbra
 Atul Mathur as the Play Actor
 Natasha Stankovic (Item number "Jimmy Choo")

Soundtrack

The album is composed by Ankit Tiwari, Millind Gaba, Rooshin – Kaizad and Gunwant Sen while the lyrics penned by Anurag Bhomia, Roosh and Sajid Qureshi.

Reception 
Bollywood Hungama said the film "is a decent funny entertainer that works despite glitches", while Movie Koop said, "Don't waste your time in this one, it will give you nightmares if you are planning to watch it."

References

External links
 
 

2018 films
2010s Hindi-language films
2018 comedy-drama films
Indian comedy-drama films